Luís Pedro Barros Barny Monteiro (born 20 July 1966), known as Barny, is a Portuguese retired footballer who played as a central defender, and the manager of Egyptian club El Gouna FC.

Playing career
Born in Porto, Barny played 332 Primeira Liga games over the course of 13 seasons, representing mainly hometown's Boavista FC. After three years of intermittent use as a youngster and a two-year spell with C.F. Estrela da Amadora, he returned to his main club, helping it to three top-four finishes during his spell there – in between, he spent the 1992–93 campaign with Sporting CP, being first-choice.

Barny retired in June 1999 at the age of 33, after three top-flight seasons with C.F. Os Belenenses and one with C.D. Aves, in his first and only second division experience. He won two Portuguese Cups from 1990 to 1992, with Estrela and Boavista.

Coaching career
Barny started coaching two years after retiring. In 2004 he rejoined Boavista as an assistant, acting as interim in the 2004–05 and 2006–07 seasons for a total of four matches (one draw and three losses).

From February 2008 to June 2009, Barny was in charge of S.C. Espinho of the third level. He then resumed his assistant career in several teams and countries, mostly under compatriot Manuel José.

Subsequently, Barny worked in the Egyptian Premier League. He led Ismaily SC to a second-place finish and the semi-finals of the Egypt Cup in his first year, and was appointed at El Gouna FC late into 2019.

Managerial statistics

Honours

Player
Estrela Amadora
Taça de Portugal: 1989–90

Boavista
Taça de Portugal: 1991–92

References

External links

1966 births
Living people
Footballers from Porto
Portuguese footballers
Association football defenders
Primeira Liga players
Liga Portugal 2 players
Boavista F.C. players
C.F. Estrela da Amadora players
Sporting CP footballers
C.F. Os Belenenses players
C.D. Aves players
Portugal under-21 international footballers
Portuguese football managers
Primeira Liga managers
Boavista F.C. managers
Ismaily SC managers
El Gouna FC managers
Portuguese expatriate football managers
Expatriate football managers in Egypt
Portuguese expatriate sportspeople in Angola
Portuguese expatriate sportspeople in Saudi Arabia
Portuguese expatriate sportspeople in Egypt
Portuguese expatriate sportspeople in Iran
Persepolis F.C. non-playing staff